Hungary competed at the 1992 Winter Olympics in Albertville, France.

Competitors
The following is the list of number of competitors in the Games.

Alpine skiing

Men

Men's combined

Women

Biathlon

Men

Men's 4 x 7.5 km relay

Women

Women's 3 x 7.5 km relay

 1 A penalty loop of 150 metres had to be skied per missed target.
 2 One minute added per missed target.

Cross-country skiing

Men

 1 Starting delay based on 10 km results. 
 C = Classical style, F = Freestyle

Women

 2 Starting delay based on 5 km results. 
 C = Classical style, F = Freestyle

Figure skating

Women

Ice Dancing

Short track speed skating

Men

Women

Speed skating

Men

Women

References

Official Olympic Reports
International Olympic Committee results database
 Olympic Winter Games 1992, full results by sports-reference.com

Nations at the 1992 Winter Olympics
Winter Olympics
1992